The men's 500 metres in short track speed skating at the 2002 Winter Olympics took place on 23 February at the Salt Lake Ice Center.

Records
Prior to this competition, the existing world and Olympic records were as follows:

The following new Olympic records were set during this competition.

Results

Heats
The first round was held on 23 February. There were eight heats of four skaters each, with the top two finishers moving on to the quarterfinals.

Heat 1

Heat 2

Heat 3

Heat 4

Heat 5

Heat 6

Heat 7

Heat 8

Quarterfinals
The top two finishers in each of the four quarterfinals advanced to the semifinals.

Quarterfinal 1

Quarterfinal 2

Quarterfinal 3

Quarterfinal 4

Semifinals
The top two finishers in each of the two semifinals qualified for the A final, while the third and fourth place skaters advanced to the B Final. In the second semifinal, American Apolo Anton Ohno caused Japan's Satoru Terao to fall, resulting in Ohno's disqualification, while Terao was advanced to the A final.

Semifinal 1

Semifinal 2

Finals
The five qualifying skaters competed in Final A, while two other raced for 6th place in Final B.

Final A

Final B

References

Men's short track speed skating at the 2002 Winter Olympics